Ryan Cortjens (born 8 January 2001) is a Belgian cyclist, who currently rides for UCI Continental team . In 2019, he won the bronze medal at the Junior World Cyclocross Championships in Bogense.

Major results

2017–2018
 Junior DVV Trophy
1st Loenhout
 UCI Junior World Cup
2nd Nommay
 2nd Junior Hasselt
 Junior Superprestige
3rd Gavere
 3rd Junior Contern
2018–2019
 1st  National Junior Championships
 2nd Overall UCI Junior World Cup
1st Heusden-Zolder
1st Namur
 2nd Overall Junior Superprestige
1st Gavere
1st Zonhoven
2nd Ruddervoorde
2nd Hoogstraten
3rd Diegem
 Junior DVV Trophy
1st Loenhout
1st Brussels
 Junior Brico Cross
1st Essen
 1st Hasselt
 1st Overijse
 3rd  UCI World Junior Championships
 3rd Junior Neerpelt

References

External links

Ryan Cortjens at Cyclocross 24

2001 births
Living people
Belgian male cyclists